USS Buttress (PCE-878/ACM-4) was an auxiliary minelayer (ACM) in the United States Navy during World War II. This ship and USS Monadnock (ACM-10) were the only ACMs not previously U.S. Army mineplanters.

Construction
Buttress was laid down as Patrol Craft Escort USS PCE-878 on 11 May 1943 at Portland, Oregon, by the Albina Engine & Machine Works; launched on 26 August 1943; and commissioned on 13 March 1944.

Service history

World War II Pacific Theatre operations 
Following commissioning, she entered the Mare Island Navy Yard for conversion to a drill mine laying and recovery ship. On 15 June 1944, PCE-878 was renamed Buttress and redesignated ACM-4. The ship was assigned to Service Squadron (ServRon) 6 and saw duty at advanced bases in the central and western Pacific Ocean through the end of the war. She returned to the West Coast at San Francisco late in December 1946.

Decommissioning 
From there, Buttress moved north to Bremerton, Washington, where she was decommissioned on 24 February 1947. Her name was struck from the Navy list on 5 March 1947, and she was sold to J. W. Rumsey on 30 October 1947 as "Pacific Reefer". Name changed later to "Aleutian Fjord" and later to "Mr. J". Scuttled sometime in the 1990s.

References

External links
 Buttress (ACM-4): Photographs
 Buttress (ACM 4) ex-PCE-878

Ships built in Portland, Oregon
1943 ships
PCE-842-class patrol craft
World War II mine warfare vessels of the United States
Unique minelayers of the United States Navy